Ultra Bra was a Finnish band, formed in 1994 by Olli Virtaperko and Kerkko Koskinen, and disbanded in 2001.

Band history
In 1994, Olli Virtaperko heard about a political song contest held by the Finnish Democratic Youth League (predecessor of the Left Youth, the Left Alliance's youth organisation) and decided to enter it with his friend Kerkko Koskinen. Koskinen composed several songs based on lyrics from his friends. A group of singers and musicians was assembled and the new band won the contest with their song "Ampukaa komissaarit, nuo hullut koirat" (Shoot the commissioners, those mad dogs).

In the summer of 1995, they released their first EP, "Houkutusten kiihottava maku". Over the course of the recording sessions, they also came up with a name for the band: Ultra Bra (which means "Very Good" in Swedish). During 1995, many new people joined the band, while others left. However, the lineup started to become fixed towards the end of the year. By the end of the year Anni Sinnemäki, Koskinen's wife who was to become the most celebrated of all UB's lyricists, began writing lyrics, starting with "Sankaritar" and "Ken Saro-Wiwa on kuollut". (The latter song refers to Nigerian environmental activist Ken Saro-Wiwa, and the circumstances surrounding his execution. The statement he made before his execution is specifically referenced.)

Their first full-length album, Vapaaherran elämää, came out in the autumn of 1996. All the while, they had been doing a lot of touring and their live reputation had become substantial. In 1997, the second album Kroketti came out. With the release of this album Ultra Bra really started to gain fame. Kroketti sold very well, remains their best selling album and contains some of their biggest hits, namely "Sinä lähdit pois" ("You Went Away") and "Minä suojelen sinua kaikelta" ("I Shall Protect You From Everything").

In 1998, they participated in the contest for a song to represent Finland in the Eurovision Song Contest. Ultra Bra did not win, but their entry, "Tyttöjen välisestä ystävyydestä" ("About Friendship Between Girls"), became a hit song. The third album, Kalifornia, was released in the spring of 1999. In early 2000, Ultra Bra again participated in the Finnish Eurovision song selection process, with "Kaikki on hetken tässä" ("In This Moment, Everything's here") without reaching the final round. In the spring, they also released several new singles. The song "Heikko valo" ("The Weak Light") also featured in the Finnish movie Levottomat (The Restless).

Their fourth album, Vesireittejä, came out on 13 October 2000. The week before it was released, numerous magazines and newspapers wrote articles about them, and they appeared on TV and on the radio. Vesireittejä went number one – and gold – on its first week in the Finnish charts.

The end of Ultra Bra
In the summer before the release of Vesireittejä, Ultra Bra decided they would continue for only about a year and then quit and start doing something else. In October 2001, they released a compilation album, Sinä päivänä kun synnyin, that contained a few new songs and many rarities, along with a music video tape and music book. After this they did a small tour of seven gigs, quitting on 20 October 2001, with maximum media coverage, surrounded by thousands of fans.

Comeback
Ultra Bra performed a comeback on 30 January 2012. It took place at Kokoaan suurempi Suomi 2012, a fundraiser concert for Pekka Haavisto's presidential campaign. Tickets to the concert sold out in two hours on 25 January and the rush crashed the online ticket service Tiketti. According to singer Vuokko Hovatta, the fundraiser was a one-off event and there are no plans for further Ultra Bra gigs.

However, Ultra Bra did a small comeback tour in Finland in the summer of 2017.

The band also performed for three ultimate concerts in Helsinki (Hartwall Arena) from 15 to 17 December 2017. The 2017 comeback also included a new compilation album, Sinä päivänä kun synnyimme, and limited-edition releases of their studio albums on coloured vinyl.

Band members
 Kerkko Koskinen – piano, main composer and quasi-leader
 Vuokko Hovatta – vocals
 Terhi Kokkonen – vocals
 Arto Talme – vocals
 Olli Virtaperko – vocals
 Antti Lehtinen – drums
 Joel Melasniemi – guitar
 Marko Portin – saxophone
 Tommi Saarikivi – bass
 Jan Pethman – percussion
 Kari Pelttari – trumpet
 Ilmari Pohjola – trombone
 Anna Tulusto – vocals (until summer 1998)

In many orchestral pieces Ultra Bra also had an additional string section and a chorus.

Current projects

 Kerkko Koskinen is a solo artist. He composes and sings his own songs and has his own band. Anni Sinnemäki, Erpo Pakkala and Juhana Rossi have written lyrics for him. Kerkko released an album on 5 April. 2002, called Rakkaus viiltää. He has also written music for Finnish movies. His second album Lolita was released in August 2005. In 2012 Koskinen founded the supergroup Kerkko Koskinen Kollektiivi with three female vocalists from other bands, including Vuokko Hovatta.
 Terhi, Joel, Tommi and Antti have joined together to form a new band called Scandinavian Music Group. Terhi writes the lyrics and Joel makes the music for their songs. Tommi quit the band in 2003 to concentrate on family life and a career as a lawyer. The band has released six albums, Onnelliset kohtaa (2002), Nimikirjaimet (2004), Hölmö rakkaus, ylpeä sydän (2006), Missä olet Laila? (2007), Palatkaa Pariisiin (2009) and  Manner (2011). Joel has also played in an Iron Maiden tribute band called Mauron Maiden
 Vuokko Hovatta has a new band, called Tekniikan ihmelapset. Vuokko is also an actress and continues to play many roles in Finnish theaters. She does many other things as well, such as Finnish movie dubbing and TV roles.
 Antti Lehtinen became the new drummer of Don Huonot, a popular Finnish band, until the band broke up in 2003. He plays percussion in Kerkko's band and has been involved in producing Kerkko's album. Antti also participates in numerous other music projects.
 Jan Pethman continues to play in the band of Maija Vilkkumaa, a Finnish singer-songwriter.
 Olli Virtaperko continues to make music with his band Ensemble Ambrosius.
 Ilmari Pohjola is a member of the bands Gourmet and Silvio. He also plays for the experimental jazz group Oddarang.
 Anni Sinnemäki has been a member of the Finnish parliament from 1999 to 2015 and was the Minister for Labour and the chairwoman of Green League 2009–2011.

Discography

Albums
 "Houkutusten kiihottava maku" (1995) ("The Exciting Taste of Temptations") (EP)
 Vapaaherran elämää (1996) ("Life of a baron")
 Kroketti (1997) ("Croquet")
 Kalifornia (1999) ("California")
 Vesireittejä (2000) ("Waterways")
 Sinä päivänä kun synnyin (2001) ("On the day I was born")(Compilation)
 Sinä päivänä kun synnyimme (2017) ("On the day we were born") (Compilation)

Singles
 "Ken Saro-Wiwa on kuollut"/"Sankaritar"/"Moskova" (1996) ("Ken Saro-Wiwa Is Dead/Heroine/Moscow")
 "Kahdeksanvuotiaana"/remix (1997) ("At The Age of Eight")
 "Sinä lähdit pois"/"Lähetystyö"/"Haikara" (1997) ("You Went Away/Mission Trip/Stork")
 "Tyttöjen välisestä ystävyydestä"/a few other songs (1998) ("About Friendship Between Girls")
 "Hei kuule Suomi"/"Helsinki-Vantaa" (1999) ("Hey Hear Us Finland"/"Helsinki-Vantaa")
 "Ilmiöitä"/"Eniten" (1999) ("Phenomena/Most of all")
 "Heikko Valo" (2000) ("Weak Light")
 "Villiviini''/"Itket ja kuuntelet" (2000) ("Boston ivy/You Cry and You Listen")
 "Rubikin kuutio"/"Lapsuus loppui" (2000) ("Rubik's Cube/Childhood Ended")

Other releases
 Kaikki laulut (sheet music book) (2001)
 Ultra Bra: Videot 1996–2001 (music video tape) (2001)
 Sokeana hetkenä (biography book) (2018)

See also
 List of best-selling music artists in Finland

References

External links
 Official site (in Finnish)
 "A Single is Born" — a Helsingin Sanomat web reportage about the birth of the song "Villiviini"

Finnish musical groups
Finnish pop music groups
Finnish rock music groups
Musical groups established in 1994
Musical groups disestablished in 2001